Richard Lee Hoover (December 15, 1929 – September 17, 2009) was an American professional bowler. He won two American Bowling Congress Masters titles in 1956 and 1957, and helped start the PBA in 1958 with founder Eddie Elias.

Born in Roseville, Ohio, Hoover grew up in Akron. He gained his first fame as a 16-year-old schoolboy by rolling an 847 series, the highest in the nation during 1946. Five years later, at 21, he became the youngest bowler to win the BPAA All-Star tournament (predecessor to the U.S. Open). A four-time All-American, he was inducted into the American Bowling Congress Hall of Fame in 1974.

Hoover owned and operated Dick Hoover's Lanes in Brunswick, Ohio.

References

1929 births
2009 deaths
American ten-pin bowling players
People from Roseville, Ohio
Sportspeople from Akron, Ohio